Kenton is an unincorporated community in Kenton County, Kentucky, United States. Kenton has a post office with ZIP code 41053, which opened on February 23, 1858.

References

Unincorporated communities in Kenton County, Kentucky
Unincorporated communities in Kentucky